Okoge may refer to:

 Okoge (food)
 Okoge (film), a 1992 gay-themed Japanese film
 Okoge, a Japanese slang term meaning fag hag